The 8th Lithuanian Cavalry Regiment was a military unit of the Grand Duchy of Lithuania, raised during the Kościuszko Uprising.

History

Origins 
Formed in 1794 from Gen. 's unit.

Kościuszko Uprising 
The unit partook in the battle of Magnuszew. On October 1794, the regiment was stationed in Wizna.

Commanders 
During the regiment's whole existence, it was commanded by Mjr. .

References 

Cavalry regiments of Lithuania
Military units and formations established in 1794